Barb Fugate is an American rugby union player and coach. She coached the US national development team. She was named to the US Rugby hall of fame.

She played at the first Women's Rugby World Cup in 1991. The  defeated  19-6 in the final to claim the 1991 World Cup.

Life 
She coached the Minnesota Valkyries Rugby Football Club.

References

External links 
 Eagles Profile
  https://www.espn.com/rugby/story/_/id/15396827/teena-mastrangelo
 https://www.jensinkler.com/becoming-unapologetically-powerful/

Living people
United States women's international rugby union players
American female rugby union players
Female rugby union players
Year of birth missing (living people)
21st-century American women